is a Japanese light novel series by Yuyuko Takemiya, with illustrations by Yasu. The series includes ten novels released between March 10, 2006 and March 10, 2009, published by ASCII Media Works under their Dengeki Bunko imprint. Three volumes of a spin-off light novel series were also created, aptly titled Toradora Spin-off!. A manga adaptation by Zekkyō started serialization in the September 2007 issue of the shōnen manga magazine Dengeki Comic Gao!, published by MediaWorks. The manga ended serialization in Dengeki Comic Gao! with the March 2008 issue, but continued serialization in ASCII Media Works' manga magazine Dengeki Daioh with the May 2008 issue.

The title Toradora! is derived from the names of the two main characters Taiga Aisaka and Ryūji Takasu.

An Internet radio show was broadcast between September 2008 and May 2009 hosted by Animate TV. A 25-episode anime adaptation produced by J.C.Staff aired in Japan on TV Tokyo between October 2008 and March 2009. A Blu-ray Disc (BD) box set containing an original video animation episode was released on December 21, 2011. NIS America licensed the anime and released it in North America in two half-season DVD collections in July and August 2010, with an English dubbed BD collection released in July 2014. A visual novel based on the series was released in April 2009 by Bandai Namco Games for the PlayStation Portable.

Plot
Ryuji Takasu is frustrated at trying to look his best as he enters his second year of high school. Despite his gentle personality, his eyes give him the appearance of an intimidating delinquent. He is happy to be classmates with his best friend Yusaku Kitamura, as well as the girl he has a crush on, Minori Kushieda. However, he unexpectedly runs into "the school's most dangerous animal of the highest risk level"—Taiga Aisaka—who just happens to be Minori's best friend. Taiga has a negative attitude towards others and has a habit of snapping violently at people. She takes an instant dislike to Ryuji, and it turns out she is living in an apartment facing Ryuji's house. When Ryuji discovers that Taiga has a crush on Yusaku, and Taiga finds out about Ryuji's affections towards Minori, they make an arrangement to help set each other up with their crushes.

Over the course of the series, Ryuji and Taiga try to set up romantic situations to help each other get to know their friends, but many of the situations backfire. Their classmates observe that they are spending a lot of time with each other, leading to rumors that they might be a couple. Although Ryuji and Taiga try to dispel the rumors, they find that they do enjoy each other's company, with Taiga visiting Ryuji's house to share meals, and Ryuji checking up on Taiga to get her to school, and cleaning for her. They meet Yusaku's childhood friend Ami Kawashima, a popular teen model who transfers into their school. She appears to be friendly and is a self-proclaimed ditz, but beneath her facade is a rather mean and spoiled brat, and she quickly finds herself at odds with Taiga. In spite of this, Taiga tries to put up with her antics as Yusaku wants them to all get along, and Ami begins to grow feelings for Ryuji. The series follows the lives of these friends and how love blossoms among them.

Characters

Main characters

The viewpoint character of the light novels, Ryuji is introduced as a second-year high school student with a mistaken reputation of being a delinquent because of his sanpaku (glaring) eyes which resemble his father's. He lives with his single mother, his father having left before he was born. Because of this, Ryuji has learned to be self-sufficient: he cooks and cleans, the latter to the point of compulsively cleaning up any messes he can find. While he looks intimidating, he is actually a very kind and selfless guy, and takes care of his mother and his friends. He has a pet parakeet named  He has a longstanding crush on the cheerful and pretty classmate Minori Kushieda. After Ryuji meets Taiga Aisaka, he often helps her with domestic chores, and develops a new reputation as the "only person able to stop the Palmtop Tiger" as well as having to fend off rumors that the two might be a couple. Although he does not have a romantic interest in Taiga, he determines he wants to look after her, help her out as much as possible, and to be friends with her.
Due to the misunderstandings caused by his appearance, as well as his family situation, he tends to have low self-esteem. In spite of this, he is rather calm in most situations and is responsible, smart, and has great grades, even compared to Yusaku Kitamura, his best friend. In seeming contrast to his intimidating looks, Ryuji actually prefers avoiding serious conflicts and tends to put others first, to the point of losing sight of what he really wants in life.
In the light novels, he sees a tender side of Taiga that she hides from everyone.  In the anime, he is dense when it comes to girls' feelings, especially when it comes to Taiga, Minori, and Ami. While initially seen as intimidating by most, he still manages to make good friends. His relationship with Taiga begins to change as he spends more time with her throughout the series, although he is oblivious to Taiga's feelings for him at first. Eventually, he reciprocates Taiga's feelings and they become a couple at the end of the series.

The other title character of the series, Taiga is a girl in Ryuji's class, and sometimes acts like a tsundere when talking to him. She has a beautiful appearance, but dislikes the company of others, with the exception of her best friend Minori Kushieda. She often receives confessions of love from boys due to her cute, or as Ryuji puts it, "doll-like" appearance, but she turns down every single one. Despite her reputation, she is actually a clumsy girl who is very shy and awkward around her crush Kitamura. Despite coming from a well-to-do family, her life with them was very difficult because of various problems. She lived with her father and step-mother and constantly fought with them, eventually moving out and living on her own. Having come from a privileged household, she does not know how to do any domestic chores. Upon meeting Ryuji and learning of his domestic talents, she relies on him to cook for her. Aside from sleeping in her own apartment and going to school, she spends most of her time at Ryuji's house, so much so that his mother considers her a member of the family. Eventually she falls in love with Ryuji and they become a couple at the end of the series.

Minori is a cheerful classmate who is Ryuji's crush and Taiga's best friend. She is captain of the girls' softball club. She tends to be air-headed at times, although it is later revealed that she is very perceptive and hardworking, being one of the few people to see Ryuji for the gentle person he is, and is also not fooled by Ami's facade. When she hears rumors that Ryuji and Taiga are a couple, she pulls both of them aside and begs Ryuji to take good care of Taiga. She works many part-time jobs preferring to keep herself busy. She enjoys food, having once made a whole tub of pudding, and teaming up with Taiga as a struggling "diet soldier". She is capable in cooking and cleaning as a result of her part-time jobs as well as taking care of her little brother while both her parents work. She is fascinated by ghosts and hopes to meet one someday, and one time, she opens up with her feelings about love to Ryuji. 

Yusaku is Ryuji's classmate and initially his only friend. He is the vice-president of the student council, the class representative, and captain of the boys' softball club. Yusaku wears glasses, and has a diligent personality. Although he thinks he is poor at talking to girls, Ryuji observes that Yusaku is actually quite popular with them. When Taiga confesses to him, he reveals that he had actually confessed to Taiga a year prior because she was so beautiful, but was rejected. While not buried in student council activities, Yusaku exhibits an eccentric personality as demonstrated in a bonus chapter where he plays the President card game without any clue of the rules, and a summer trip story where he wears just a towel around and randomly flashes the girls. In a later storyline, it is revealed he had a crush on the student council president Sumire Kanō, but got so depressed over her departure that he bleached his hair. His nickname is "Maruo".

Ami is Yusaku's childhood friend who transfers into his class midway through their second year of high school. She has been working as a fashion model, and is very popular with the guys and girls. However, behind the facade is a spoiled brat who looks down on everyone that she isn't trying to impress. Yusaku hopes that Ami will be honest with her true character, and not have such a dual nature. She develops a fierce rivalry with Taiga, and flirts with Ryuji to demonstrate how she can easily manipulate him to take him away. However, Ryuji and the other main characters are all aware of her true nature. In the storyline where she is trying to evade a stalker, she ends up depending on Ryuji and Taiga, although the latter blackmails her using footage of Ami's singing and reciting a list of Pokémon. After seeing Taiga standing up to the stalker, she drops her sweet facade in front of Ryuji to chew out the stalker, and later asks Ryuji if he would come to love her real self. Taiga calls her a dumb chihuahua, even though Ami has no idea how such a description applies. She comes from a rich background; her family has a lavish vacation home that she takes Ryuji (and the gang) over the summer. She often understands the feelings of others easily, hence constantly teasing everyone for being naive. Over the course of the series, she becomes attracted to Ryuji despite regularly teasing him.

Supporting characters

Ryuuji's parakeet. Her name is the Japanese word for parakeet. Though apparently healthy, she sometimes looks sickly. Despite struggling to say her simple name (a running gag throughout the series), she has a good understanding of human speech and can interact with her owners and pronounce words much more difficult than her name. She seems to be mentally inept. 

Ryuji's mother who works nights at a hostess bar. She acts childish and like an airhead, depending on Ryuji to cook and clean for her. She is often seen getting in trouble with the landlady for whatever shenanigans go on in their apartment. She is proud that Ryuji is able to go to high school, something she was not able to complete. She initially claims that her husband died before he was born, but it is later revealed that he left her instead. She instantly takes a liking to Taiga and treats her like a family member.

Yuri is Ryuji's homeroom teacher. She has a reputation of telling long stories that class representative Kitamura stops immediately to dismiss the class. She likes to do things at her own pace and is timid towards Taiga's way of speaking out. In the fifth volume of the light novel, she becomes concerned about getting into a relationship leading to marriage before she turns 30, but when that birthday comes, she develops a twisted and depressed personality, which is further aggravated whenever Taiga mentions that she is single.

Kōji is Ryuji's classmate who has long hair. He is regarded as the class 'idiot' and that opinion is deepened by his poor school marks and overly energetic behavior. His childish pranks often target Taiga and as a result he has been the victim of her violent outbursts. Despite his overly energetic behavior, later in the series he is revealed to have a girlfriend.

Hisamitsu is a male student in Ryuji's class who wears glasses. He was also in Ryuji's class the previous year and is on good terms with him. He is first seen during the basketball warmup scenario where he pairs up with Minori. Noto begins to develop feelings for Maya Kihara following an argument they had during the class winter ski trip.

Maya is Ryuji's attractive classmate who often hangs out with Nanako. She is a kogal and the center of the 'stand out group' of girls of class 2-C. She ends up pairing with Yusaku in basketball warmups. She has a crush on Yusaku, and she circuitously opposes the idea of Taiga and Yusaku being a couple, and wants Taiga and Ryuji to be together.

Nanako is a female student in Ryuji's class who often hangs out with Maya and Ami.

Sumire is the student council president. She has a strong-minded personality and inspires fellow students to follow her. Her parents own a supermarket. Because she always gets the top marks for her class each year, her notes become one of the sought-after prizes in the school festival event.  When she tells the council she plans to leave school early to study in the United States to become an astronaut, Yusaku is so heartbroken that he dyes his hair and quits the council.. When he later confesses his love for her in front of the whole school, she pushes him away. After fighting with Taiga, she reveals that she does love Kitamura, but doesn't tell him fearing that he'll chase after her to America.

Kōta is a first-year student who is the main character in Toradora Spin-off!. He is generally unhappy about his life. He works on the student council in general affairs, and gets good grades. When first seen, he has a completely mistaken idea what the term "Palmtop Tiger" refers to, and develops an insane crush on Taiga.  He later develops a crush on Sakura, and eventually succeeds in starting a romantic relationship with her.

Media

Light novels

Toradora! began as a series of light novels written by Yuyuko Takemiya and drawn by Yasu. Ten novels were published by ASCII Media Works under their Dengeki Bunko imprint between March 10, 2006 and March 10, 2009. There are four additional chapters not collected into volumes; three of which appeared in three separate light novel anthologies released by MediaWorks in November 2006, March 2007, and November 2007, and the last chapter entitled Toradora! came with a plush tiger stuffed animal first released in April 2007. Seven Seas Entertainment licensed series in North America, releasing the first volume in 2018 and the last in 2020.

Three volumes of a spin-off of the regular series under the title  were also created. The first volume of the spin-off series was released on May 10, 2007 and compiled four chapters, three of which had been serialized in MediaWorks' now-defunct light novel magazine Dengeki hp between June 10, 2006 and February 10, 2007, and the last chapter was written especially for the volume release. A single chapter of the spin-off series, originally published in February 2006 in Dengeki hp was included in the second volume of the regular novel series. More chapters started serialization in Dengeki hp'''s successor Dengeki Bunko Magazine on December 10, 2007. Additional chapters of the main series started serialization in the same magazine on April 10, 2008. The second volume of Toradora Spin-off! was released on January 10, 2009 followed by the third volume on April 10, 2010. The third volume was released to commemorate the Year of the Tiger (2010).

Manga

A manga adaptation illustrated by Zekkyō started serialization in the September 2007 issue of MediaWorks' shōnen manga magazine Dengeki Comic Gao!. The manga ended its run in Dengeki Comic Gao! in the March 2008 issue, but continued serialization in ASCII Media Works' manga magazine Dengeki Daioh from the May 2008 issue. The first tankōbon volume was released on February 27, 2008 under ASCII Media Works' Dengeki Comics imprint; as of January 26, 2023, eleven volumes have been released. North American publisher Seven Seas Entertainment began publishing the series in English on March 1, 2011.

Internet radio show
An Internet radio show to promote the anime series and other Toradora! media titled  aired 38 episodes between September 4, 2008 and May 28, 2009 on Animate TV. The show was streamed online every Thursday, and was hosted by Junji Majima and Eri Kitamura who voiced Ryūji Takasu and Ami Kawashima from the anime, respectively. The show featured additional voice actors from the anime as guests.

Anime

A Toradora! anime television series was first announced on a promotional advertisement for light novels being released under ASCII Media Works' Dengeki Bunko imprint for April 2008. The anime is directed by Tatsuyuki Nagai and produced by the animation studio J.C.Staff. Toradora! contains 25 episodes, which aired between October 2, 2008 and March 26, 2009 on TV Tokyo in Japan. The episodes aired at later dates on AT-X, TV Aichi, TV Hokkaido, TV Osaka, TV Setouchi, and TVQ Kyushu Broadcasting. The anime premiered in the Philippines through TV5 on May 18, 2009, one of the first to air it outside Japan. The first volume DVD compilation, which contains the first four episodes was released in Japan on January 21, 2009 by King Records in limited and regular editions. Seven more DVD compilations, each containing three episodes, were released between February 25 and August 26, 2009 also in limited and regular editions. Starting from the second DVD, there were extra animated shorts included in the DVD volumes, Toradora SOS!, which features the cast as chibis trying out various foods. The Toradora! anime was licensed by NIS America as its first anime. The series was released in two half-season DVD compilation volumes in early July and late August 2010. A six-disc Blu-ray Disc box set, released in Japan on December 21, 2011, contains an original video animation (OVA) episode. It was broadcast in Italy on Rai 4 between April 28 and October 13, 2011. NIS America re-released the series on Blu-ray on July 1, 2014, including the unreleased OVA and featuring an English dub. MVM Films have licensed the Blu-ray collection in the United Kingdom. The anime series was streamed on Netflix on August 1, 2020.

The anime series makes use of four pieces of theme music: two opening and two ending themes. The insert theme for episode nineteen is  performed by Kugimiya and Kitamura. The anime's original soundtrack was released on January 7, 2009.

Video games
A visual novel developed by Guyzware and published by Bandai Namco Games based on Toradora! is playable on the PlayStation Portable, and was released on April 30, 2009. The player assumes the role of Ryuji Takasu where he moves around school and town, conversing with characters and working towards multiple endings as part of an original storyline. The game also features a minigame where players play as Taiga, fending off lovesick guys.

Taiga is a playable character in the RPG, Dengeki Gakuen RPG: Cross of Venus for the Nintendo DS, released on March 19, 2009 in Japan. She also appears as a cameo character and optional costume for the main character in Nippon Ichi Software's Z.H.P. Unlosing Ranger VS Darkdeath Evilman for the PlayStation Portable. Taiga is also a playable character in the fighting game Dengeki Bunko: Fighting Climax, with Ryuji as an assist character. She also appears in  Twinkle Crusaders Starlit Brave which was released on September 30, 2010.

Reception

The Mainichi Shimbun reported in April 2009 that over 3 million copies of the light novel series have been sold in Japan. The light novel series has ranked four times in Takarajimasha's light novel guide book Kono Light Novel ga Sugoi! published yearly: sixth in 2007, fourth in 2008 and 2010, and second in 2009. In Kadokawa Shoten's first Light Novel Award contest held in 2007, Toradora! won an award in the romantic comedy category. The seventh volume of the Toradora! light novels was ranked tenth best selling between December 2007 and November 2008 by Amazon.co.jp. The second volume of the Toradora! manga was ranked 28th on the Tohan charts between March 3–9, 2009. Taiga Aisaka became the champion of the eighth Anime Saimoe Tournament in 2009. The Toradora! anime was selected as a recommended work by the awards jury of the thirteenth Japan Media Arts Festival in 2009. In 2009, Rie Kugimiya won the Best Actress in the third Seiyu Awards partly for voicing Taiga Aisaka.

The first Toradora! DVD was ranked 13th on the Oricon DVD chart between January 20–26, 2009. The second DVD was ranked 15th between February 24 and March 2, 2009. The third DVD was ranked 27th between March 24–30, 2009. The fourth DVD was ranked 17th between April 21–28, 2009. The fifth DVD was ranked 7th between May 25–31, 2009. The sixth DVD was ranked 11th between June 22–28, 2009. The seventh DVD was ranked 19th between July 20–26, 2009. The eighth DVD was ranked 13th between August 24–30, 2009. THEM Anime Review's Stig Høgset commends the anime for how it "actually resolves the relationship issue it set out to do instead of wimping out like so many romantic shows with several girls tends to do in an attempt to not make people angry or disappointed." He also comments Taiga as the "genetical marriage" of Shana from Shakugan no Shana and Louise from Zero no Tsukaima. However, he also criticized "Taiga's continuous behavior, particularly towards Ryuji" and the introduction of Taiga's father in which Høgset "felt that the whole story arc jerked me around".

Notes
 "LN" is shortened form for light novel and refers to a volume number of the Toradora! light novels.
 "Ch." and "Vol." are shortened form for chapter and volume, referring to the Toradora! manga
 "Ep." is shortened form for episode of the Toradora!'' anime
In the TV Tokyo anime profile, she is listed as  In the NIS America anime profile she is listed as 4 feet 7 inches.

References

External links

Toradora! at TV Tokyo 
Visual novel official website 
Toradora! anime at NIS America (archive)
Toradora! manga at Seven Seas Entertainment

Toradora!
2006 Japanese novels
2007 manga
2008 anime television series debuts
2009 video games
2011 anime OVAs
Anime and manga based on light novels
ASCII Media Works manga
Book series introduced in 2006
Dengeki Bunko
Dengeki Comic Gao!
Dengeki Comics
Dengeki Daioh
Kadokawa Dwango franchises
J.C.Staff
Japan-exclusive video games
Japanese high school television series
Japanese serial novels
Light novels
Novels set in high schools and secondary schools
PlayStation Portable games
PlayStation Portable-only games
Romantic comedy anime and manga
School life in anime and manga
Seven Seas Entertainment titles
Shōnen manga
Slice of life anime and manga
Television shows based on light novels
Television shows written by Mari Okada
TV Tokyo original programming
Video games developed in Japan
Visual novels